Chopawamsic Creek is a  tributary of the Potomac River in Prince William and Stafford counties, Virginia. Chopawamsic Creek is formed by the confluence of the North and South Branches of Chopawamsic Creek and empties into the Potomac River south of Quantico at the Marine Corps Base Quantico's Air Station. Breckenridge Reservoir lies at the stream's confluence with the North and South Branches. Along with its North Branch, Chopawamsic Creek forms part of the boundary between Prince William and Stafford counties. The North Branch flows through part of the Chopawamsic Backcountry Area in Prince William Forest Park.

Variant names
The Board on Geographic Names decided upon Chopawamsic Creek as the stream's official name in 1891. Previously, it had been known by the following names according to the Geographic Names Information System:
Chapanamsick Creek 	
Chapawansick Creek 	
Chapowamsic Creek 	
Chipawanic Swamp 	
Chipawansic Creek
Chippowamsick Creek 	
Chopawansick Creek 	
Chopowamsic Creek

Tributaries
Tributary streams are listed from source to mouth.

North Branch Chopawamsic Creek
Middle Branch Chopawamsic Creek
South Branch Chopawamsic Creek

See also
List of rivers of Virginia

References

Rivers of Stafford County, Virginia
Rivers of Virginia
Rivers of Prince William County, Virginia
Tributaries of the Potomac River